Logan Creek is a census-designated place (CDP) on the east shore of Lake Tahoe in Douglas County, Nevada, United States. The population was 26 at the 2010 census.

Geography
Logan Creek is located along U.S. Route 50, north of Lakeridge and south of Glenbrook.

Demographics

References

Census-designated places in Douglas County, Nevada
Census-designated places in Nevada